Kattankudy Division 3 Grama Niladhari Division is a Grama Niladhari Division of the Kattankudy Divisional Secretariat, of Batticaloa District, of Eastern Province, Sri Lanka.

Demographics

Ethnicity

Religion

References 

Batticaloa District